Parand railway station (Persian:ايستگاه راه آهن پرند, Istgah-e Rah Ahan-e Parand) is located in Parand, Tehran Province. The station is owned by IRI Railway.

References

External links

Railway stations in Iran